The Man from Kangaroo is a 1920 Australian silent film starring renowned Australian sportsman Snowy Baker. It was the first of several films he made with the husband and wife team of director Wilfred Lucas and writer Bess Meredyth, both of whom had been imported from Hollywood by E. J. Carroll.

Plot
John Harland is a former boxer turned reverend posted to the town of Kangaroo in Australia. He falls in love with Muriel, an orphaned heiress, and discovers that her  guardian Martin Giles is embezzling her inheritance. Harland earns the ire of parishioners by teaching young boys to box, and Giles manipulates local opinion to have the bishop remove him.

Harland rescues a gentleman from a mugging in Sydney who suggests that he go to Kalmaroo where a criminal gang has driven the church out of the area. Harland preaches, and unexpectedly sees Muriel in the congregation; her property is near Kalmaroo.

But her overseer is Red Jack Braggan who leads the gang which violently breaks up Harland's mission – much to the distress of Muriel who regards Harland as too timid – and is in cahoots with Giles. Harland goes to work as a station hand at a property neighbouring Muriel's.

Giles arranges for Red Jack to kidnap Muriel so that he might marry the girl and thus prevent her giving evidence against him. Harland rescues Muriel: they leap from the stage coach as it thunders across Hampden Bridge into the Kangaroo River.

Cast

Production
Baker visited Hollywood in 1918 to shoot additional scenes for The Lure of the Bush and to study production methods. With E. J. Carroll he arranged to bring back a team of Americans to assist them making movies in Australia, including director Wilfred Lucas, his wife, screenwriter Bess Meredyth, actor Brownie Vernon, assistant director John K. Wells and cinematographer John Doerrer.

Meredyth spent a few months in the Mitchell Library in Sydney looking for topics to make movies about. It was later stated at the Royal Commission on the Moving Picture Industry in Australia that Meredyth felt "the only truly national subject about which producers could make a picture [in Australia] was horse racing. Australians, she said, had not yet developed any distinctive individuality of national character or tradition." This is what prompted the Carrolls to make all their films with Lucas and Baker about bush and station life.

The film was shot on location in Kangaroo Valley and Gunnedah, with interiors at the Theatre Royal in Sydney during September and October 1919.

Carroll-Baker Productions was formed in 1919 with a capital of £25,000 between E. J. Carroll, his brother Dan, Snowy Baker and the Southern Cross Feature Film Company. Said Dan Carroll at the time:
It Is not our intention to make any one subject which will not be of such a standard that it cannot be market ed in every English-speaking country in the world. With this ambition in view we are proud enough to think that we are being of national service to our own beloved Australia.

They bought a house, "Palmerston" in the Sydney suburb at Waverley and converted it into a studio. They ultimately made only two more films, The Shadow of Lightning Ridge (1920) and The Jackeroo of Coolabong (1920).

Reception
The film was a success at the box office.

The magazine The Lone Hand dated 24 February 1920 said that the film was:. . . is exceedingly   good. It   should   be   the   object   of   the   producers   to   make   the   public  for   the   moment,   that   the   star   of   the  production   was   once   a   champion   boxer,  and   yet,   in   one   scene,   they   go   to   the   trouble of   putting   in   a   sub-title   to   that   effect.

Nor does   “Snowy”   exactly   fit   into   the   role   of   a  parson   with   his   massive   athlete's   shoulders  and   his   square,   heavy   jaw.

The   story,   from   a   dramatic   point   of   view,  lacks   interest,   it   being   obvious   that   the  plot   has   been   woven   with   a   view   to   giving  the   star   full   rein   to   exhibit   his   equestrian  abilities,   and   this   rather   destroys   the   possibilities   for   the   romantic   element,   so   satisfying   to   the   public   taste.

References

External links

The Man from Kangaroo at the National Film and Sound Archive

1920 films
Australian drama films
Australian silent feature films
Australian black-and-white films
Films with screenplays by Bess Meredyth
Films directed by Wilfred Lucas
1920 drama films
Silent drama films